Saint-Bonnet-près-Bort (literally Saint-Bonnet near Bort; Auvergnat: Sent Bonet prep Baurt) is a commune in the Corrèze department in central France.

Population

See also
Communes of the Corrèze department

References

Communes of Corrèze